Seeing Stars was an Australian television variety series which aired live from 1957 to 1959 on Melbourne station ABV-2 (it is not known if it was also telerecorded for broadcast in Sydney). The series featured a mix of singers, dancers, vocal groups, and instrumental groups. Some episodes were "themed", for example 27 April 1959 episode featured a calypso theme while 16 September 1957 featured a French night club setting. The final episode aired 18 May 1959.

An episode of this series may be held by the National Archives of Australia (per a search of their website).

References

1957 Australian television series debuts
1959 Australian television series endings
Australian Broadcasting Corporation original programming
Black-and-white Australian television shows
English-language television shows
Australian variety television shows